Charles II or Charles John Amadeus (Carlo Giovanni Amedeo in Italian) (23 June 1489,  Turin, Piedmont – 16 April 1496), was the Duke of Savoy from 1490 to 1496 but his mother Blanche of Montferrat (1472–1519) was the actual ruler as a regent. In 1485 his father Charles I had received the hereditary rights to the Kingdoms of Cyprus, Jerusalem, and Armenia which were inherited by young Charles.

Biography 

During his reign, Charles VIII of France invaded Italy and conquered Naples; and the House of Savoy, under Blanche's regency, allowed Charles free passage through the duchy.

Born in Turin, Duke Charles died in Moncalieri at about seven, falling by his bed. His duchy was therefore inherited by his granduncle Philip II (reigned 1496–1497), the male heir of the Savoy line. Charles's heir-general was his underage sister Violante Ludovica, who was married to Philip's eldest son Philibert the Handsome. Violante however died in 1499, 12 years old and childless, leaving the 18-year-old Philibert (who had succeeded his elderly father as Duke in 1497) a widower. Charles's and Violanta's next heir general was their first cousin Princess Charlotte of Naples (1479–1506), daughter of their aunt Anne of Savoy. The next year, Charlotte married Nicolas Guy de Montfort, Count of Laval (as Guy XVΙ). Their female descendants claimed the Kingdom of Jerusalem, although de jure their claims to the Kingdom of Cyprus, Jerusalem and Armenia (as well as the rights of René of Valois-Anjou) belong to the line of the heir general, not to the line of Philip II, Duke of Savoy.

References 

1489 births
1496 deaths
15th-century Dukes of Savoy
Nobility from Turin
Counts of Geneva
Claimant Kings of Jerusalem
Accidental deaths from falls
Italian people of Cypriot descent
Monarchs who died as children
Medieval child monarchs